Wallersheim is a municipality in the district of Bitburg-Prüm, in Rhineland-Palatinate, western Germany.

Wallersheim belonged to the Prüm Abbey until the end of the 18th century. In 1815/16 Wallersheim came under Prussian rule.  The parish church is dedicated to St. Nicholas.

References

Bitburg-Prüm